Minus the Bear was an American indie rock band formed in Seattle, Washington, in 2001, and comprising members of Botch, Kill Sadie, and Sharks Keep Moving. Their sound was described as "Pele-esque guitar-taps and electronics with sophisticated time signature composition."

Minus the Bear released six albums and four EPs. The band's final line-up consisted of Jake Snider (vocals, guitar), Dave Knudson (guitar), Cory Murchy (bass guitar), and Alex Rose (synthesizers, vocals). On July 17, 2018, the band announced their retirement and accompanying farewell tour. Their final live performance was December 16, 2018, at The Showbox in Seattle.

History
Minus the Bear formed in 2001, and played its first gig three days after 9/11 at the Seattle venue The Paradox. Suicide Squeeze Records released their debut full-length album Highly Refined Pirates on November 19, 2002.

On January 2, 2006, Matt Bayles, keyboard player and producer for Minus the Bear, announced that he would be leaving the band to focus all his time on his career as a producer. His last performance with the band was on January 28, 2006. He was replaced by Alex Rose, who previously worked as a sound engineer on the band's second full-length album, Menos el Oso. Interpretaciones del Oso, an album of remixed songs from their second full-length album Menos el Oso, was released on February 20, 2007, by Suicide Squeeze Records.

The band's third full-length album, Planet of Ice, was released on August 21, 2007, by Suicide Squeeze Records and contains ten tracks. As well as an exclusive iTunes bonus track titled "Cat Calls & Ill Means", a bonus CD containing two B-sides, "Electric Rainbow" and "Patiently Waiting", a demo version of "Ice Monster", and a remix by P.O.S. of the album's first single, "Knights", was released with the album's first edition.

In 2008, the band recorded four tracks live on Daytrotter that were released for free with a membership to the website. Later that year, the band also released an acoustic EP, Acoustics, which contained an unreleased track, "Guns & Ammo", and acoustic versions of six previously released tracks. On October 27, 2009, the band released a two-song single, "Into The Mirror", on various digital music outlets; exclusive 7" vinyl copies were sold on tour.

On February 17, 2010, Dangerbird Records announced that it had signed Minus the Bear and that it would distribute the group's next release. A week later, it was announced that the album was titled Omni and that it was scheduled to be released on May 4, 2010. On May 8, 2010, Minus the Bear was the first band to be featured on RadioVA and was interviewed by David Lowery. On August 5, 2010, Minus the Bear opened for fellow Seattle band Soundgarden in their pre-Lollapalooza warm up show at the Vic Theatre in Chicago.

On January 9, 2012, the band began recording a fifth full-length album with producer Matt Bayles, their former keyboard player. An announcement on their Facebook page on April 30, 2012, said that the new album had been recorded and that it had been sent off for mastering. On June 21, 2012, Dangerbird Records announced this album, Infinity Overhead, would be released on August 28, 2012. On June 29, 2012, Minus the Bear announced on rollingstone.com the release of the first single from Infinity Overhead, entitled "Lonely Gun". On July 10, 2012, it was announced that Minus the Bear would be joining the Big Scary Monsters record label in the UK and that Infinity Overhead was to be released on BSM in September 2012.

On July 10, 2013, Minus the Bear announced that they would release Acoustics II, a ten-track LP with eight acoustic versions of old songs and two new tracks. An acoustic version of "Hooray" was given to everyone who pre-ordered the album.

To celebrate the tenth anniversary of the They Make Beer Commercials Like This EP, the band played two small shows in the early part of 2014 on the west coast of the US. That summer, the band announced a new full-length compilation album entitled Lost Loves. The LP was released in both vinyl and CD form and contains music which did not seem to fit in a sequential order appropriate enough, at the time, to be put on a full-length release. The tracks "Invented Memory" and "Lucky Ones" were the only tracks that were unavailable before the release of the compilation. The latter was made available before the album's release through SoundCloud and on the band's official web page. The band toured in support of the new EP and continued the celebration of their Beer Commercials LP in the second half of 2014.

On January 29, 2015, the band officially announced via its Facebook page that drummer Erin Tate was no longer a member of the band. "It is with heavy hearts that we regret to inform you that due to personal and creative differences, Minus the Bear and Erin Tate have decided to part ways," signed by Dave, Jake, Cory, and Alex. The band then talked about future tours and continuing to work on the follow-up album to Infinity Overhead. The band's sixth album, VOIDS, was released on March 3, 2017.

On July 17, 2018, the band announced they would be disbanding following a farewell tour that would end on December 14 in their hometown of Seattle, and that they would be releasing a final EP, Fair Enough, in October.  After tickets sold out in minutes, the band added dates on December 15 and December 16. Their final live performance was December 16, 2018 at The Showbox in Seattle.

Band name
The name "Minus the Bear" comes from an in-joke among the band members, referring to the 1970s television series B. J. and the Bear. "A friend of the band had gone on a date," explained singer-guitarist Jake Snider, "and one of us asked him afterwards how the date went. Our friend said, 'You know that TV show from the '70s, B. J. and the Bear? It was like that ... minus the Bear.' That’s the straight truth."

Band members
Final lineup
Jake Snider – guitar, lead vocals (2001–2018)
Dave Knudson – guitar (2001–2018)
Cory Murchy – bass guitar (2001–2018)
Alex Rose – keyboards, backing vocals (2006–2018)

Touring musicians
Joshua Sparks – drums (2017–2018)

Previous members
Matt Bayles – keyboards (2001–2006)
Erin Tate – drums (2001–2015)
Kiefer Matthias – drums (2015–2017)

Timeline

Discography

Studio albums

EPs and others

Remix albums

Music videos
"The Game Needed Me" from Menos el Oso
"Pachuca Sunrise" from Menos el Oso
"Knights" from Planet of Ice
"Throwin' Shapes" from Planet of Ice
"My Time" from Omni
"Hold Me Down" from Omni
"Steel and Blood" from Infinity Overhead
"Listing" from Infinity Overhead
"Last Kiss" from VOIDS

References

External links
 

 
Alternative rock groups from Washington (state)
Arena Rock Recording Company artists
Indie rock musical groups from Washington (state)
Musical groups established in 2001
Musical groups disestablished in 2018
Musical groups from Seattle
Musical quintets
Suicide Squeeze Records artists
Dangerbird Records artists